Unlike A Virgin is the second album of Slovenian band Silence, released on October 18, 1999. According to the band, it covers about eight years of work. Most of the songs were actually written at the very beginnings of Silence (92-94) and labeled "too strange for publication" at the time. It was awarded "Album of the year" in "Orkus", one of the most influential German alternative music magazines. It received top reviews by "Hannoversche Allgemeine Zeitung", "Ragazzi", "Online.de", "Wrath" and "Zillo" to mention a few.

Track listing
 "Son Of Sin"  – 4:38
 "Drive"  – 4:52
 "Scream, Greeneyes"  – 4:12
 "Etwas"  – 1:28
 "The Fifth Elephant"  – 4:03
 "Barbara"  – 4:27
 "God Forsaken Country"  – 4:10
 "Heavy Straighter"  – 4:36
 "Nevermind The Bastard"  – 4:28
 "4-2"  – 4:05
 "P.S."  – 5:49
 "Tschudno"  – 3:55*

 * Unlisted bonus track.

Personnel
 Silence is:
 Boris Benko
 Primož Hladnik
 All songs written by Boris Benko. 
 All tracks produced by Peter Penko at Raingarden 9, Ljubljana except tracks 8, 9 and 12.
 Tracks 8, 9 and 12 produced by Gregor Zemljič and Miha Klemenčič at Microlab, Ljubljana.
 Mastering by Janez Križaj at Metro, Ljubljana.
 Editing by Aleš Dvoržak at Kif Kif, Ljubljana.
 Front cover and photos by Fred Stichnoth.
 Layout by Boris Benko and Carl D. Erling.
 Additional musicians:
 Double Bass, tracks 5 and 12, by Žiga Golob.
 Cello, track 10, by Barbara Jarc.
 Guitars by Peter Penko. 
 Strings, track 7, by Jelena Ždrale and Eva-Julia Rečnik.
 Special thanks to: Vera & Bogdan Benko, Metka & Boštjan Hladnik, Bajča, Zemljič & konjič, Katrin, Žare, Marta, Dalibor, Waldo, Grebo, Jure Novak, Rok Predan, Irena, Jani Novak and Pero "zmagovalec snemalec".
 Realized by: Carl D. Erling.
 Label: Chrom Records

External links
Silence discography: Unlike a Virgin

1999 albums
Silence (band) albums
Albums recorded in Slovenia